Yazathingyan or Yaza Thingyan ( – 1312/13) was a co-founder of Myinsaing Kingdom in present-day central Myanmar.

Yazathingyan may also refer to:
 Yazathingyan of Pagan:  Chief Minister of Pagan (1240s–1260) and commander-in-chief of the royal army (1258–1260)
 Yazathingyan Nga Mauk:  Brother of Nga Nu
 Yazathingyan (15th-century minister):  Chief Minister of Ava (1426–1468)